Saint Jo Independent School District is a public school district based in Saint Jo, Texas (USA).

Located in Montague County, a small portion of the district extends into Cooke County.

Academic achievement
In 2009, the school district was rated "recognized" by the Texas Education Agency.

Schools
Saint Jo High School (Grades 7-12)
Saint Jo Elementary School (Grades PK-6)
2005 National Blue Ribbon School

Special programs

Athletics
Saint Jo has fielded a football team every season since 1924. Their first game in school history was a 25–0 loss to the Nocona Indians. St. Jo continued to play one or two games a year until the mid 1930s. It was during this time St. Jo captured the first win in Panther history, a 7–6 upset of Bowie. They followed up this victory with two routs of local Bellevue by a combined score of 119–0. The Panthers continued to improve through the years, notching winning seasons in 1941 and 1948. In the early 1950s, St. Jo developed a rivalry with the local Muenster Hornets. The game's winner annually was awarded the Coveted Horseshoe. St. Jo won their first shoe after a 20–12 victory over the Big Red in 1952. The mid-1960s were the glory years for Panther football. From 1963-66 the maroon and white compiled a 35–8 record, two bi-district championships, and an impressive 4-year winning streak over Muenster.

See also

List of school districts in Texas

References

External links
Saint Jo ISD

School districts in Montague County, Texas
School districts in Cooke County, Texas